William Fredrick Geddie (born July 17, 1955) is an American television producer. He is best known for being co-creator and the former executive producer of ABC Daytime's The View, on the ABC television network. He is also a partner with Barbara Walters in BarWall Productions and is responsible for co-producing popular American television shows such as The Barbara Walters Special and The 10 Most Fascinating People annual special. Bill Geddie is also owner of May Avenue Productions.

Early life
Geddie was born in San Antonio, Texas. He graduated from the University of Texas at Austin in 1977, majoring in communications/film.  He started out buffing the floors at KOCO-TV, in Oklahoma City and Geddie has stated that  "When you buffed the floors—this is how informal television was back then—they let you run camera for the local news. What got me off the floor was that I went to the news director and said I had shot film before, so he gave me a job shooting film."

Professional life

Geddie is the co-creator and the original executive producer for The View from its launch in August 1997 until his ouster in 2014.

His role on The View came into question at times. Geddie was frequently featured on the show, acknowledging "If I can be the brunt of a joke, if I can do to get a laugh or if I can help in any way that's what I'll do.' Otherwise, that is it. I stay out of the way... if you watch the show, you see that generally speaking I'm a side player and I'm basically there to get a laugh." He had well documented disagreements, in particular, with former hosts Star Jones, Rosie O'Donnell, and guest host Kathy Griffin. He was pushed out after Barbara Walters announced her retirement from the show in May 2014.

ABC Entertainment named Geddie as executive producer for Tamron Hall on January 22, 2019. He left the show in March 2020.

Awards & nominations
Geddie has received six Emmy Awards nominations and two wins. In 2003, he won a Daytime Emmy Awards in the Outstanding Talk Show category for his work as executive producer of The View. To date, he has scored ten Daytime Emmy nominations. He was presented the Lifetime Achievement Award at the 39th Daytime Emmy Awards on June 23, 2012 for his contributions as writer, producer and director in his more than 30-year television career. Malachy Wienges, chairman of NATAS, stated: "Bill Geddie is an icon in the television industry."

Geddie is a screenwriter in his spare time. He wrote the script for Unforgettable, a movie starring Ray Liotta and Linda Fiorentino.

References

External links

Bill Geddie at TV Guide
Bill Geddie interview with Katie Dickman

1955 births
Television producers from Texas
Daytime Emmy Award winners
Living people
People from San Antonio
Moody College of Communication alumni
Television personalities from Texas